Timothy Busfield (born June 12, 1957) is an American actor and director. He has played Elliot Weston on the television series thirtysomething; Mark, the brother-in-law of Ray Kinsella (Kevin Costner) in Field of Dreams; and Danny Concannon on the television series The West Wing. In 1991 he received a Primetime Emmy Award for Outstanding Supporting Actor in a Drama Series for thirtysomething. He is also the founder of the 501(c)(3) non-profit arts organization Theatre for Children, Inc.

Early life and education
Busfield was born June 12, 1957, in Lansing, Michigan, the son of drama professor Roger and Michigan State University Press Director Jean Busfield. He graduated from East Lansing High School in 1975. He received his first professional acting job at 18 in a children's theater adaptation of Shakespeare's A Midsummer Night's Dream. Busfield studied drama at East Tennessee State University and traveled frequently with the Actors Theater of Louisville, which took him to Europe and Israel. In 1981, he moved to New York City, where he joined the Circle Repertory Company for their production of Lanford Wilson's Talley and Son. That same year, he was cast in his first film role with a bit part as a mortar-bearing soldier in the comedy Stripes (1981).

Career
More stage work followed, including a stint as understudy to Matthew Broderick in Brighton Beach Memoirs in 1982. The following year, Busfield relocated to Los Angeles to join the cast of Reggie (ABC, 1983), a short-lived comedy based on the British television series The Fall and Rise of Reginald Perrin (BBC, 1976–79). In 1984, Busfield received his first substantial film role as Arnold Poindexter, one of the Lambda Lambda Lambda fraternity brothers in the comedy Revenge of the Nerds (1984) and its 1987 sequel, and joined the cast of the medical drama Trapper John, M.D. (CBS, 1979–1986), as the son of Pernell Roberts' Trapper John McIntyre, a role he held until the series' conclusion in 1986.

Following Trapper John, M.D., Busfield and his brother Buck created the Fantasy Theatre, a professional touring company for children's audiences—and later named Honorary State Children's Theater for California—based in his new hometown of Sacramento, California. The Busfields also established the award-winning B Street Theatre there in 1992, which was devoted to more adult productions. The following year, Busfield was cast as Elliot on thirtysomething. The part was his first mature role to date, and the producers requested that Busfield, who was then clean shaven, grow a beard to help sell his image as a married man and father. Over the course of the show's four-season run, Elliot came to personify the best and worst aspects of the series: a successful advertising executive and father, Elliot also infuriated his friends and family (and viewers) with his marital infidelity and competitive streak with partner Michael Steadman (Ken Olin), all of which went on while his wife Nancy (Patricia Wettig) struggled with ovarian cancer. Despite his character's unpleasant tendencies, Busfield brought humor and honesty to the role, and was nominated three times for an Emmy before winning one in 1991, shortly before conflicts between the producers and cast brought the show to an abrupt conclusion.

Busfield had remained exceptionally busy during his thirtysomething stint, appearing as the nominal villain in the popular Kevin Costner fantasy Field of Dreams in 1989, and in 1990, replacing Tom Hulce as the lead in A Few Good Men, a smash Broadway production written by Aaron Sorkin, with whom he would later enjoy fruitful collaborations. He also made his directorial debut with a 1990 episode of thirtysomething, and would helm three episodes of the series before it ran its course. Roles in television features and theatrical films followed, including supporting turns in Sneakers (1992), Quiz Show (1994) and the likable kids' fantasy Little Big League (1994), which allowed Busfield to show off his baseball skills as the first baseman for the Minnesota Twins (an avowed baseball fan, Busfield occasionally served as pitcher in several minor league games). His character, Lou Collins, was loosely based on Twins legend Kent Hrbek. Hrbek would serve as a consultant on the film and he and Busfield became friends.

Busfield returned to network television several times during the late 1990s for high-profile shows that never quite caught on with viewers. He was the patriarch of the Byrd clan, which moved from Connecticut to Hawaii in the Steven Bochco-produced The Byrds of Paradise (ABC, 1993–94), and starred as one of a group of former high school jocks still clinging to their glory days in Champs (ABC, 1996) for Ron Howard.

By the late 1990s, Busfield was dividing his time between acting and directing for television, helming multiple episodes of several shows, including Sorkin's Sports Night (ABC, 1998–2000), as well as Ed (NBC, 2000–04), for which he also served as co–executive producer and guest star (as Ed's down-on-his-luck brother Lloyd). During this period, Busfield also began his recurring role as Pulitzer Prize–winning White House correspondent—and love interest to Allison Janney's C.J. Cregg—Danny Concannon on The West Wing. He would appear sporadically on the show throughout its entire network run.

Busfield kept a foot on both sides of the camera from 2000 on; directing and executive producing the successful CBS drama Without a Trace (2002–09) and appearing occasionally as the wheelchair-using divorce attorney for Anthony LaPaglia's Jack Malone. He also directed episodes of Las Vegas (NBC, 2003–08), Damages (FX, 2007–12), and Studio 60 on the Sunset Strip. On the latter, he also co-starred on the short-lived Aaron Sorkin series as Cal Shanley, the occasionally nerve-plagued control director for the program's self-titled show-within-a-show. Though that show was ultimately canceled, despite much marketing as the "next big thing," in 2007, Busfield moved on, serving as executive producer of the Brooke Shields-led drama, Lipstick Jungle (NBC, 2008–2009).

In 2019, Guest Artist, directed by Busfield, premiered at the Santa Barbara International Film Festival. The film is written by and stars Jeff Daniels. Guest Artist was shot on location in New York City, and in Daniels' hometown of Chelsea, Michigan. This film marks the launch of Grand River Productions, a production company with Daniels, Busfield, and Melissa Gilbert.

In 2020, Busfield appeared as a guest on the Studio 60 on the Sunset Strip marathon fundraiser episode of The George Lucas Talk Show.

Busfield voiced the title character in Marvel New Media/SiriusXM's radio drama podcast series Marvel's Wastelanders: Star-Lord, appearing alongside Chris Elliott, Patrick Page, Vanessa Williams and Danny Glover.

Stage and theater
Busfield remains a stage actor and director whose Broadway credits include A Few Good Men and Brighton Beach Memoirs, where he was star Matthew Broderick's understudy. Off-Broadway, he worked with Circle Repertory Company in 1982. With elder brother Buck Busfield, he is co-founder of the B Street Theatre in Sacramento, California, where he has appeared in and directed numerous contemporary works. The Busfield brothers also established Fantasy Theater, a touring troupe that plays to children. Busfield writes children's plays for the Fantasy troupe. 
Timothy Busfield professional theatre credits

 1979 - Various roles, The Green Mountain Guild Theatre for Children (actor)
 1979 - Thidwick The Big Hearted Moose, Actor’s Theatre of Louisville-ATL (act)
 1979 - A Christmas Carol, ATL, (act)
 1979 - Commencement (various roles), ATL (act)
 1980 - They’re Coming To Make It Brighter, ATL Humana Festival (act)
 1980 - The Green Mountain Guild Theatre For Children (act/director)
 1980 - Getting Out, ATL International Tour w/Susan Kingsley (act)
 1980 - Cyrano de Bergerac, ATL (act)
 1980 - Shorts (various roles), ATL (act)
 1981 - Park City Midnight, ATL Humana Festival (act)
 1981 - Propinquity, ATL Humana Festival (act)
 1981 - Spades, ATL Humana Festival (act)
 1981 - A**hole Murder Case, ATL Humana Festival (act)
 1981 - A Life, The Long Wharf Theatre (act)
 1981 - A Tale Told, The Mark Taper Forum (act)
 1982 - Richard II, Circle Repertory Company (act)
 1982 - The First Annual Young Playwright’s Festival, Circle Rep (act, various roles)
 1982 - The Holdup, Circle Rep (act)
 1982 - Brighton Beach Memoirs, The Ahmanson
 1983 - Brighton Beach Memoirs, The Curren (SF) And The Alvin (Broadway) (act)
 1986 - Theatre for Children, Inc., (Fantasy Theatre) (Producing Director 1986-2001)
 1986 - Fantasy Fables, (dir/co-writer)
 1987 - Fantasy Classics, (dir/co-Writer)
 1987 - Fantasy Americana, (dir/co-Writer)
 1988 - Fantasy of Horrors, (co-writer)
 1988 - Fantasy Festival II, (dir)
 1988 - Fantasy of Franks, (dir/co-writer)
 1989 - William Shakespeare V The Fantasy Theatre (dir/co-writer)
 1989 - By George! (co-writer)
 1990 - The Bark of Zorro the Musical (co-writer book)
 1990 - A Few Good Men, Broadway (act)
 1992 - B Street Theatre (Producing Director 1992–2001)
 1992 - Mass Appeal (act), B St. Theatre
 1992 - Hidden In This Picture w/Aaron Sorkin, (act/dir), B. St.
 1992 - Talley’s Folly (act/dir), B. St
 1993 - Fool For Love (act)
 1993 - Private Wars (act)
 1994 - A Couple of White Chicks (dir)
 1994 - The Agent (act/dir)
 1994 - The Holdup (dir)
 1994 - Criminal Hearts (dir)
 1995 - National Anthems (act/dir)
 1996 - Below The Belt (act)
 1997 - Vigil (act)
 1998 - The Motor Trade (act/dir)
 1998 - Vigil (act)
 1999 - Boomtown (act/dir)
 2000 - Escanaba in Da Moonlight (act)
 2008 - Vigil (act), Westport Country Playhouse
 2012 - Vigil (act, dir), Lansing Community College
 2017 - 24 hour plays, Minneapolis

Personal life
Busfield was married to actress and director Radha Delamarter before divorcing in 1986. The couple had a son, Willy. In 1988 he married fashion designer Jennifer Merwin, with whom he had children Daisy and Samuel. They filed for divorce in 2007.

A representative for Busfield said in January 2013 that Busfield had become engaged to actress Melissa Gilbert over the holiday season. They were married April 24, 2013, in a private ceremony at San Ysidro Ranch in Santa Barbara, California.  Busfield and Gilbert resided in Howell, Michigan, from 2013 to 2018 but moved to New York City late in 2018. During the 2016–17 academic year, Busfield served as an artist in residence at Michigan State University.

Filmography

As actor

Film

Television

As director

 Thirtysomething (1987–1991)
 Sports Night (1998–2000)
 Ed (2000–2004)
 Lizzie McGuire (2001)
 Without a Trace (2002–2009)
 Las Vegas (2003–2004; 2007–2008)
 Studio 60 on the Sunset Strip (2006–2007)
 Damages (2007–2011)
 Lipstick Jungle (2008)
 Lie to Me (2009)
 White Collar (2009)
 The Deep End (2010)
 The Glades (2010)
 No Ordinary Family (2010)
 Psych (2012)
 Franklin & Bash (2012)
 Revolution (2013)
 The Fosters (2013)
 Childrens Hospital (2013)
 Secrets and Lies (2015)
 The Night Shift (2015–2017)
 Second Chance (2016)
 Aquarius (2016)
 This Is Us (2017)
 Nashville (2017–2018)
 Designated Survivor (2018–2019)
 One Dollar (2018)
 The Rookie (2018)
 Guest Artist (2019)
 Dolly Parton's Heartstrings (2019)
 The Conners (2020)
 FBI (2021)
 FBI: Most Wanted (2022)
 Chicago Med (2022)

References

External links
 

1957 births
Male actors from Michigan
20th-century American dramatists and playwrights
American male stage actors
American male television actors
American television directors
East Tennessee State University alumni
Outstanding Performance by a Supporting Actor in a Drama Series Primetime Emmy Award winners
Followers of Meher Baba
Living people
Male actors from Lansing, Michigan
People from East Lansing, Michigan
Male actors from Sacramento, California
20th-century American male actors
21st-century American male actors